Dunai may refer to:

Places 
Dunai, Nepal, the headquarter of Dolpa District
Dunai Solar Park, photovoltaic power system in Százhalombatta in Hungary

Technology 

 Dunai radar, a system of two Soviet radars 
P-19 radar, a 2D UHF radar

People 
Antal Dunai (born 1943)
Ede Dunai (born 1949), Hungarian footballer
János Dunai (born 1937), Hungarian footballer
Lajos Dunai (1942–2000), Hungarian footballer
 (born 1949), Hungarian actor